Łąkorek  is a village in the administrative district of Gmina Biskupiec, within Nowe Miasto County, Warmian-Masurian Voivodeship, in northern Poland.

The village has an approximate population of 200.

Notable residents
 Friedrich Lange (1849–1927), German surgeon

References

Villages in Nowe Miasto County